Shamil Borchashvili (born 9 June 1995) is an Austrian judoka. He immigrated to Wels, Austria with his family from Chechnya, Russia when he was a child.

Borchashvili won the silver medal at the 2021 Judo Grand Slam Tbilisi in the -81 kg class.

Borchashvili won the bronze medal in the men's 81kg Judo competition in the postponed 2020 Summer Olympics held in 2021 in Tokyo. 

Borchashvli won another bronze medal in the Men's 81 kg at the 2022 World Judo Championships by defeating 2020 Olympic silver medalist Saeid Mollaei.

He is a first degree black belt.

References

External links

  Official Website
 
 
 

Living people
1995 births
Austrian male judoka
Austrian people of Georgian descent
Austrian people of Chechen descent
Judoka at the 2019 European Games
European Games medalists in judo
European Games bronze medalists for Austria
Judoka at the 2020 Summer Olympics
Olympic judoka of Austria
Olympic medalists in judo
Olympic bronze medalists for Austria
Medalists at the 2020 Summer Olympics
Chechen people
People from Wels
Sportspeople from Upper Austria
21st-century Austrian people